Masii is a small town in Kenya's Machakos County, Kenya.
Myth has it that the settlent got its name from Storkbirds (Ngoto). It was narrated that Masii used to be inhibited by s certain tree Itungi which bears fruits that were a delicasy for this immigrating birds. Masii was their home escaping winter in Europe. When humans settled in Masii they cut the Itungi tree to the detriment of the immigrating birds. When they time to land in Masii came the birds found their paradise destroyed and they left wailing thina twooneie masii sii sii (the disaster we faced in Masii) and thus was the birth of the name of the settlement. It also marked their birth of a saying, warning people against disaster – "be careful not to experience what Ngoto (storkbird) experienced in Masii".Majority of the people living in masii come from the akamba community. Swahili and Kamba are the most Common languages in the area.

Towns in Machakos County

References 

Machakos County
Populated places in Eastern Province (Kenya)